Charles E. "Charlie" Barkley (born October 16, 1950) is an American politician from Maryland and a member of the Democratic Party. He served five terms in the Maryland House of Delegates, representing Maryland's District 39 in Montgomery County. He served on the Economic Matters Committee and as Chair of the Montgomery County Delegation.

Born in Elkins, West Virginia on October 16, 1950, Barkley graduated from Towson State University with a Bachelor of Science degree in education. He later earned a Master of Education degree in Administration from Western Maryland College. Barkley was active in educational advocacy throughout his career, and is a former Vice President of the Montgomery County Education Association. He has remained active on education issues throughout his time in the Assembly.

Career

Legislative Notes
 Voted in favor of in-state tuition for undocumented immigrants in 2007 (HB6)

Election results
2006 Race for Maryland House of Delegates – 39th District
Voters to choose three:
{| class="wikitable"
|-
!Name
!Votes
!Percent
!Outcome
|-
|-
|Nancy J. King, Democratic
|18,651
|  23.5%
|   Won
|-
|-
|Charles E. Barkley, Democratic
|18,253 
|  23.0%
|   Won
|-
|-
|Saqib Ali, Democratic
|16,455
|  20.7%
|   Won
|-
|-
| David Nichols, Republican
|   9,278 
|   11.7%
|   Lost
|-
|-
| Gary Scott, Republican
|   8,363 
|   10.4%
|   Lost
|-
|-
|Bill Witham, Republican
|  8,244
|  10.4%
|   Lost
|}

1994 Race for Maryland House of Delegates – District 39
Voters to choose three:
{| class="wikitable"
!Name
!Votes
!Percent
!Outcome
|-
|-
|Mathew Mossburg, Rep.
|13,119
|  17%
|   Won
|-
|-
|Barrie S. Ciliberti, Rep.
|12,897
|  16%
|   Won
|-
|-
|W. Raymond Beck, Rep.
|12,311
|  16%
|   Won
|-
|-
|Charles E. Barkley, Dem.
|12,137
|  15%
|   Lost
|-
|-
|Anise Key Brown, Dem.
|10,987
|  14%
|   Lost
|-
|-
|Anthony J. Santangelo, Dem.
|10,939
|  14%
|   Lost
|-
|-
|Patricia Cummings, Ind.
|6,471
|  8%
|   Lost
|}

References
  

1950 births
Living people
Democratic Party members of the Maryland House of Delegates
National Education Association people
Towson University alumni
People from Elkins, West Virginia
People from Germantown, Maryland
21st-century American politicians